Swingamajig is an annual music festival that takes place in Birmingham, West Midlands, England. It is the UK's first one-day urban festival dedicated to electro swing, Gypsy folk and vintage sounds. Swingamajig "takes the sounds and styles of the 1920s and brings them up to date with a modern twist, bringing together several thousand of the best dressed ladies and gents to party like it is 1929". First held in May 2013, Swingamajig Festival comprises elements of live music, DJ sets, film, art, dance and circus performances across four diverse stages.

History 
Swingamajig grew out of the success of Hot Club de Swing, a regular electro swing club night that began in 2011 and is held at the Hare and Hounds, Kings Heath, Birmingham. Curated by The Electric Swing Circus, one of the UK's hottest electro swing acts who have performed at Glastonbury Festival, Shambala Festival, Boomtown, Bestival, Secret Garden Party, WOMAD, Nozstock and Mostly Jazz Festival, the success of Hot Club De Swing led to the band's development of Swingamajig in 2013.

Line up 2013 

The festival was held at Spotlight, Digbeth, Birmingham and featured the following acts:

Line up 2014 

Swingamajig 2014 took place on 4 May at Spotlight, Digbeth, Birmingham and featured the following artists:

DJ sets

References

Music festivals in the West Midlands (county)
Festivals in Birmingham, West Midlands